Longsdorf is a village in the commune of Tandel, Luxembourg.

The hamlet of Marxbierg (or Marxberg) forms part of the village.

Tandel
Villages in Luxembourg